J-Bay or Jbay may refer to:

Jason Bay, Canadian former professional baseball outfielder
Jeffreys Bay, a town in the Eastern Cape province of South Africa